Walter Krause (born 8 May 1953) is a German former footballer.

He scored 119 goals in the 2. Bundesliga. Before the start of the 2012–13 season only four players amassed more goals than Krause in the (West) German second division.

External links

References

1953 births
Living people
Association football midfielders
German footballers
Kickers Offenbach players
Hamburger SV players
MSV Duisburg players
Rot-Weiß Oberhausen players
SG Wattenscheid 09 players
Bundesliga players
2. Bundesliga players